June R is a 2006 Indian Tamil-language drama film directed by Revathy Varmha. The film stars Jyothika in the title role which was her 25th Tamil film along with the supporting cast Khushbu Sundar, Saritha and Biju Menon. The film's soundtrack are composed by Malayalam composer Sharreth, while Madhu Ambat was the cinematographer. The film released in February 2006. The Hindi remake of the film, Aap Ke Liye Hum, remains unreleased.

Plot
June R (Jyotika), an orphan, was born in the month of June, for which she was named. She works in an advertising agency. One day she happens to come across a middle-aged woman (Saritha) hurt badly in an accident. She admits her in hospital and tells the doctor that it is her mother Rajalakshmi in order to save her life from the regular hierarchical rules of the hospital. Coming to Rajalakshmi (named by June) who happens to be Mrs. Raniammal, a widowed woman who strives to bring up her only son Arun (Biju Menon) whereas Arun smitten by his wife's words for the wealth and money of his mother, plans to send her away from his home to an orphanage in order to settle with his wife in New York City. Deeply hurt, Raniammal finds solace in June's company, who also longs for a motherly love since childhood. June decides to take Rajalakshmi to her house and calls her mom. Both together (June and Rajalakshmi) cherish life who once were starved for love. Later her son comes back again to take his mother back, Rajalakshmi realising her sons evil thoughts refuses to get back to him. Later on Rajalakshmi's refusal he visits June and quarrels with her to give back his mother, June baffles with his sudden love for his mother. This implies an emotional entangle between the both meanwhile Rajalakshmi falls sick and June on seeing Raniammal's pathetic condition brings her brother  (Ravikumar) whom she wanted to meet before she dies. On visiting Rajalakshmi's home town she unveils the mystery behind his sudden love for his mother. Now entrant Amudha (Khushbu Sundar)  a noted and leading lawyer aids June to get back her new mother legally, prostrating Arun's wicked thoughts in the law of court . At last the judgement favours June . Though June succeeds in her mission of getting back her mother, but fate has some storm in its store, June finds Rajalakshmi dead when she comes back. Now comes Raja (Suriya), a rich client of June's advertising agency falls in love with her who consoles her on this uncompensable loss and takes her along with him, just the way her mother Rajalakshmi wished.

Cast
Jyothika as June R. (Voice over by Jayageetha)
Khushbu Sundar as Amudha   (Voice over by Anuradha)
Saritha as Rajalakshmi
Biju Menon as Arun
Ravikumar as Rajalakshmi's brother
Siddharth Venugopal as Sundar 
Suriya as Raja (guest appearance)

Production
Revathy Varma had published June R as a novelette in the English periodical Woman's Era and wanted to make the story into a feature film. She approached a Hindi film producer in Mumbai and decided that Jaya Bachchan, Tabu and Kareena Kapoor would play the lead roles in the film. Jyothika suggested that the film should be made in Tamil first and production began and Kushboo was signed on for a key role. Saritha was selected over Urvashi for another senior role in the film. Biju Menon, a Malayalam actor, was also picked to play a leading role in the film.

Release
The film was initially scheduled for release in June 2005 but was later pushed back to release in the Diwali season of 2005 so the film could be promoted more heavily. The film was also caught up when Kushboo's films were temporarily banned after her comments on pre-marital sex angered Indian political parties.

Soundtrack

The soundtrack of the film was composed by Sharreth, being his second project in Tamil after Magic Magic 3D (2003). The audio of June R was launched at Green Park Hotel in Chennai on 10 September 2005 by Balamurali Krishna, with singer Usha Uthup also in attendance.

References

External links
 

2006 films
2000s Tamil-language films
Films scored by Sharreth
Indian drama films
Indian feminist films
Films about women in India
Tamil films remade in other languages
2006 directorial debut films